There are several fire service agencies which cover various areas and municipalities in Sussex County, New Jersey in the United States.

State agencies

 New Jersey Forest Fire Service, Division A. The agency's Division A headquarters and its air attack base (Aeroflex–Andover Airport) is located in the county at Kittatinny Valley State Park in Andover Township. Sussex County is covered by the agency's sections A1, A3, and A4.
New Jersey Forest Fire Service is also known as Sussex County Station 99 Fire.

County agencies
Sussex County does not have a county-wide fire department. The county's fire marshal and office of emergency management is overseen by the Sussex County Sheriff's Office. The fire marshal enforces the state's Uniform Fire Code in county-owned buildings and assist local fire officials with enforcement of same, coordinate incident activities once a fire-related incident has grown beyond a local fire department’s span of control, investigates fire incidents for causes, and educates the public on fire safety and fire protection matters.

Sussex County Community College offers courses and training to firefighting personnel at its Public Safety academy located in [[Hampton Township, New Jersey|].

Municipal departments
Sussex County has 24 municipalities. None of these municipalities has a paid fire department staffed with municipal employees. All fire departments in the county at the municipal or local level are unpaid, volunteer fire departments. Several of these fire departments incorporate a rescue or emergency medical services component.

References

External links
 Sussex County Firemans' Association

Fire departments in New Jersey
Firefighting in New Jersey
Sussex County, New Jersey